Euchromius rayatellus is a species of moth in the family Crambidae described by Hans Georg Amsel in 1949. It is found in France, Italy, Greece, Bulgaria, Ukraine, Russia and Turkey, Afghanistan, Jordan, Iran, Iraq, Syria and Israel.

References

Moths described in 1949
Crambinae
Moths of Europe
Moths of Asia